Richard James Butler is a vertebrate palaeontologist at the University of Birmingham, where he holds the title of professor of palaeobiology. His research focuses on ornithischian dinosaur evolution, dinosaur origins, and fossil tetrapod macroevolution.

Biography 
Butler's undergraduate degree is a BSc in geology from the University of Bristol (2002). His Ph.D., in 2007, is from the University of Cambridge. 

He then worked at the London Natural History Museum as, first a postdoctoral research assistant (2006–2008), and then a NERC researcher co-investigator (2008–2009). From 2009 through 2011, he held an Alexander von Humboldt Fellowship at the GeoBio-Center, in Munich, Germany, followed for 2011–2013 as junior research group leader there. 

He then came to the University of Birmingham, first as a Birmingham Fellow (2013–2015), then a Senior Birmingham Fellow and Academic Keeper of its Lapworth Museum of Geology (2015–2017). In 2017 he was appointed to a personal chair at Birmingham as professor of paleobiology.

Professional work 
According to his web page at Birmingham, his interests are:

 "Systematics, taxonomy, and anatomy of fossil reptiles, particularly dinosaurs and closely related groups
 Terrestrial recovery from the Permo-Triassic mass extinction event
 Phanerozoic and Mesozoic diversification patterns among vertebrates, and fossil record quality
 Late Palaeozoic–Mesozoic vertebrate biogeography
 Body size evolution and its drivers in deep time
 Early evolution of the avian respiratory system, and lung ventilation among fossil archosaurs"

His most cited papers, according to Google Scholar are:

 Butler RJ, Upchurch P, Norman DB. The phylogeny of the ornithischian dinosaurs. Journal of Systematic Palaeontology. 2008 Jan 1;6(1):1-40., cited 237 times
 Brusatte SL, Nesbitt SJ, Irmis RB, Butler RJ, Benton MJ, Norell MA. The origin and early radiation of dinosaurs. Earth-Science Reviews. 2010 Jul 1;101(1-2):68-100,  cited 204 times
 Benson RB, Butler RJ, Lindgren J, Smith AS. Mesozoic marine tetrapod diversity: mass extinctions and temporal heterogeneity in geological megabiases affecting vertebrates. Proceedings of the Royal Society B: Biological Sciences. 2009 Nov 18;277(1683):829-34.  cited 158 times
 Barrett PM, Butler RJ, Edwards NP, Milner AR. Pterosaur distribution in time and space: an atlas. Zitteliana:An Internal Journal of Paleontology and Geology. (University of Zurich) 2008:61-107.  cited 126 times

References 

Academics of the University of Birmingham
Alumni of the University of Bristol
Alumni of the University of Cambridge
Living people
Paleobiologists
Year of birth missing (living people)